Pitcairnia flexuosa is a plant species in the genus Pitcairnia. This species is endemic to Mexico.

References

flexuosa
Flora of Mexico